Tancred (fl. 1104) was the Count of Syracuse and a member of the Hauteville family. He was appointed by his relative Roger I of Sicily to govern one of the first and only feudal counties created in Sicily after the Norman conquest. His predecessor was Roger's son, Jordan. His descendant, Simon, still ruled Syracuse in the middle of the twelfth century.

References
Abulafia, David (1977). The Two Italies: Economic Relations between the Norman Kingdom of Sicily and the Northern Communes. Cambridge: Cambridge University Press. .

Italo-Normans
Norman warriors
12th-century rulers in Europe
Counts of Syracuse